El Iberoamericano is a Spanish language opinion journal about politics, economics, culture and social issues. Its name derives from the word Ibero-America which refers to those countries in the Americas that were originally colonies of Spain and Portugal (virtually all of Latin America).

Its contents are updated daily with opinion pieces from some of the most renowned columnists from Latin America, Europe and the United States.

It was first published on Columbus Day 2004 and in its short lifetime it has become an influential vehicle of opinion in several Spanish-speaking countries.

El Iberoamericano's "Declaration of Purpose" cites as its main objective "the dissemination of opinions whose essential purpose is the defense of the cause of human freedom." Its editorial line can be described as  Classic Liberal and strongly Western, upholding the values of individual autonomy, private property and a laissez-faire economic policy.

Its Editor-in-Chief is K. Dahbiah.

External links
 El Iberoamericano - Periódico de Opinión

Political magazines published in the United States
Magazines established in 2004
Spanish-language magazines
Spanish-language mass media in the United States